Teck Whye LRT station is an elevated Light Rail Transit (LRT) station on the Bukit Panjang LRT line in Choa Chu Kang, Singapore, located at the junctions of Bukit Batok Road, Choa Chu Kang Way and Choa Chu Kang Road.

Teck Whye is the name given to the station as it is near Teck Whye Heights, which is a cluster of HDB flats forming part of Choa Chu Kang along Teck Whye Avenue and Teck Whye Lane. This station is in the vicinity of ITE College West.

As of January 2017, Teck Whye station has Half-Height Platform Barriers installed at both platforms of the station.

Station details

Station design
The LRT station has the conventional barrel-roof design like the rest of the stations on the BPLRT. The design was chosen by the Bukit Panjang residents when the BPLRT was being constructed.

References

External links

Railway stations in Singapore opened in 1999
Choa Chu Kang
LRT stations of Bukit Panjang LRT Line
Light Rail Transit (Singapore) stations